EA7 may refer to:
Amarna letter EA 7, a letter of correspondence in ancient Egypt
EA7, a label marketed by Italian fashion house Armani
Edgley EA-7 Optica, a British light aircraft